The anglicisation of personal names is the change of non-English-language personal names to spellings nearer English sounds, or substitution of equivalent or similar English personal names in the place of non-English personal names.

Anglicisation of personal names

Classical, Medieval and Renaissance figures

A small number of figures, mainly very well-known classical and religious writers, appear under English names—or more typically under Latin names, in English texts. This practice became prevalent as early as in English-language translations of the New Testament, where translators typically renamed figures such as Yeshu and Simon bar-Jonah as Jesus and Peter, and treated most of the other figures in the New Testament similarly. In contrast, translations of the Old Testament traditionally use the original names, more or less faithfully transliterated from the original Hebrew. Transatlantic explorers such as Zuan Chabotto and Cristoforo Colombo became popularly known as John Cabot and Christopher Columbus; English-speakers anglicized and Latinized the name of the Polish astronomer Mikołaj Kopernik to (Nicholas) Copernicus, and the English-speaking world typically knows the French-born theologian Jean Calvin as John Calvin. Such anglicisations became less usual after the sixteenth century.

Non-English-language areas of Great Britain and Ireland

Most Gaelic language surnames of Ireland, Scotland, and the Isle of Man have been anglicized at some time. The Gaels were among the first Europeans to adopt surnames during the Dark Ages. Originally, most Gaelic surnames were composed of the given name of a child's father, preceded by Mac (son) or Nic (or Ní, both being variants of nighean, meaning daughter) depending on the gender. These surnames would not be passed down another generation, and a woman would keep her birth surname after marriage. The same was originally true of Germanic surnames which followed the pattern [father's given name]+son/daughter (this is still the case in Iceland, as exemplified by the singer Björk Guðmundsdóttir and former Prime Minister Sigmundur Davíð Gunnlaugsson). When referring to siblings collectively (or to members of a family or clan that share a "Mac-" surname), the prefix for son or daughter was pluralised. By example, MacAoidh (son of Hugh) becomes MicAoidh (sons of Hugh) and Clann MhicAoidh (literally children/descendants of Hugh). The Jacksons in English (with Jack being derived from John) would in Gaelic be rendered a' MhicSheain (the sons of John).

Over the centuries, under the influence of post-Medieval English practice, this type of surname has become static over generations, handed down the male lineage to all successive generations so that it no longer indicates the given name of a holder's father any more than the suffix -son on a Germanic language surname does today. Among English-speaking peoples of Gaelic heritage, the use of Nic as a prefix for daughters has been replaced by Mac, regardless of sex (as per Geraldine McGowan, Alyth McCormack, and Sarah McLachlan). Wives also began to take on the surnames of their husbands.

Another common pattern of surname was similar to that preceded by Mac/Nic, but instead was preceded by Ó or Ui, signifying a grandchild or descendant. Not all Gaelic surnames signified relationship to a forebear, however. Some signified an ancestral people or homeland, such as MacDhubhghaill (son of a dark-haired foreigner; referring to one type of Scandinavian), MacFhionnghaill (son of a fair-haired foreigner; also referring to a Scandinavian people), MacLachlainn or MacLachlainneach (son of a Scandinavian). Others indicated the town or village of a family's origin, sometimes disguised as an ancestor's name as in Ó Creachmhaoil, which prefixes a toponym as though it was the name of a person. As with other culturo-linguistic groups, other types of surnames were often used as well, including trade-names such as MacGhobhainn, Mac a'Ghobhainn or Mac Gabhainn (son of the smith), and physical characteristics such as hair colour.

In anglicizing Gaelic names, the prefixes Mac, Nic, and Ó were frequently removed (the name Ó Fathaigh, by example, was sometimes anglicized as Fahey or Fay, identically to the given name; Ó Leannáin and Ó Lionáin have both been anglicized as Lennon; Ó Ceallaigh and Ó Cadhla have been anglicized as Kelly). Where they were retained, Mac was often rendered Mc, M', or Mag- (the last is seen in renderings such as Maguire for Mac Uidhir) and Ó/Ui became O. MacGhobhainn, Mac a'Ghobhainn and Mac Gabhainn (son of the smith) were anglicized as McGowan, Gowan, McGavin, and Gavin. In surnames which had been prefixed Mac (which includes most Manx surnames), the final hard c sound remained when the Mac was removed. As Gaelic spelling rules required the first letter of a name preceded by Mac or Nic to be lenited (providing it was a consonant other than l, n, or r, which are not generally lenited in Gaelic, or c or g; although in the case of the last two, they are lenited when the intended connotation is "son/daughter of" rather than a surname. By example, if stating that James (Scott) is the son of Calum (Stuart) in Gaelic, it would be phrased Seumas mac Chaluim, as distinct from Seumas MacCaluim for a James with the surname MacCaluim) with the addition of an h after it (originally, this had been indicated in handscript by a dot above the letter, but with the introduction of printing with movable type the h was substituted) after a consonant (silencing it, or changing its sound), and for the last vowel to be slender (i or e) if male, the anglicized form of a Gaelic name could look quite different. By example, MacPhearais (Mac+Pearas=son of Pierce) has been anglicized as Corish, and MacAonghais has been anglicized as MacAngus, MacInnis, MacInnes, Innis, Innes, and Guinness.

Gaelic names were also sometimes anglicized by translating the prefix Mac into the suffix son, as per the Germanic practice. MacPhearais, consequently, has been anglicized as Pearson, MacDomhnaill has not only been anglicized as MacDonald and MacDonnell, but also as Donaldson, and MacAoidh (Mac+Aodh) has been anglicized as Hewson (it is also anglicized as McHugh and Hughes). The Gaelic MacSheain or MacSheathain (son of Seán) has similarly been anglicized Johnson or Jackson (it has also been less thoroughly anglicized as MacIain and MacIan).

The other main changes made in anglicisation from Gaelic names of Ireland, Scotland, and the Isle of Man are the removal of silent letters, and respelling according to English phonetics (as Ó Creachmhaoil or Creachmhaoil became Craughwell or Crockwell, and MacDhubhghaill became Dougal). Ó Briain has often become O'Brien, Ó Rothláin became Rowland, Ó Néill became O'Neill and some surnames like Ó Súilleabháin may be shortened to just O'Sullivan or Sullivan. Similarly, the forename Somhairle has been altered to Sorley, the surname MacGill'Leathain or MacGill'Eathain to MacLean, and MacAoidh to Mackay.

As with Gaelic and Germanic surnames, Welsh surnames and Cornish surnames had originally been mostly patronymic, though others contained toponymic elements, or were derived from trades, or personal characteristics. Surnames which remained fixed across generations, passed down along the male line of descent (provided parents were married) were adopted under the dictate of the English Government from the sixteenth century. As in the Gaelic-speaking areas, many Welsh (Cymric) patronyms were anglicised by omitting the prefix indicating son of and either exchanging the father's Welsh forename for its English equivalent, or re-spelling it according to English spelling rules, and, either way, most commonly adding -s to the end, so that the such as 'ap Hywell' became Powell, and 'ap Siôn' to Jones or Upjohn. The first generation to adopt this Agmicisation hereafter handed it down unchanged to children. Many Cornish (Kernewek) names have been anglicised in similar ways.

Immigration to English-speaking countries
Anglicisation of non-English-language names was common for immigrants, or even visitors, to English-speaking countries. An example is the German composer Johann Christian Bach, the "London Bach," who was known as "John Bach" after emigrating to England.

During the time in which there were large influxes of immigrants from Europe to the United States and United Kingdom during the 19th and 20th centuries, the given names and surnames of many immigrants were changed. This became known colloquially as the "Ellis Island Special," after the U.S. immigrant processing center on Ellis Island; contrary to popular myth, no names were ever legally changed at Ellis Island, and immigrants almost always changed them at their own discretion.

Traditionally common Christian given names could be substituted: such as James for the etymologically connected Jacques. Alternatively phonetical similarities, such as Joe for Giò (Giovanni or Giorgio); or abbreviation, Harry for Harilaos, or Ricky for Enrique (Henry), as common in Spanish, instead of for (Ricardo) Richard as in English.

The anglicisation of a personal name now usually depends on the preferences of the bearer. Name changes are less common today for Europeans emigrating to the United States than they are for people originating in, or descending from those who emigrated from, East Asian countries. Requests that the bearer anglicize their personal name against their wishes are viewed as a form of racism or xenophobia.

French surnames

French immigrants to the United States (both those of Huguenot and French-Canadian background) often accommodated those unfamiliar with French pronunciations and spellings by altering their surnames (or encounter having them altered) in either of two ways: spellings were changed to fit the traditional pronunciation (Pariseau became Parizo, Boucher became Bushey, Mailloux became Mayhew, Cartier became Carter, Carpentier became Carpenter), or pronunciations were changed to fit the spelling (Benoît, pronounced , became Benway, or Bennett ).Provencher, Jean, 'Quebec surnames that have become very strange', October 15, 2014.Anglicized French Surnames, Projet GenWeb du Québéc

Some anglicized French-Canadian surnames:

Arpin – Harp, Harper
Baudin – Borden, Boardway
Beauparlant – Wellspeak
Bélanger – Baker
Berthiaume – Barcomb
Boileau – Drinkwater
Boisvert – Greenwood
Blais, Bélair – Blair 
Boivin – Drinkwine
Camaraire – Cameron 
Choiniere – Sweeney
Charron – Wheeler
Chenard – Snow
Clément – Claymore
Cloutier – Cary, Carey, Clutchey, Clukey 
Darche – Dash 
Deschamps – Fields 
Deslauriers – Delorey
Duffet, Douffett – Duff, Duffney
Favreau – Farrow 
Fournier – Furnia – Fuller
Fugère – Fisher
Gadoury – Gadrow
Garnier – Garner 
Gaulin – Cole 
Laflèche – Flagg
Lapierre – Stone 
Larivière – Rivers
Lavallée – LaValley-LaVallie- Lovely
Leblanc – White 
Lefebvre – Bean
Lévesque – LeVesque – Bishop
Loiseau – Bird 
Marcheterre – Walker
Maillet – Myers
Meunier – Miller
Peltier – Pelkie – Pelkey 
Petit – Small 
Racine – Root 
Rondeau – Rondo
Roy – King, Ware 
Séguin – Saya
Ste-Marie – St. Mary
Tisserand – Weaver
Therrien – Landers
Varieur, Verieul – Waite

Scandinavian surnames
Scandinavian surnames were often anglicized upon the immigrant's arrival into the United States.

 Sjöberg: Seaborg
 Johansen, Johnsen, Johansson: Johanson or Johnson
 Carlsson, Karlsson: Carlson
 Kjellberg: Chellberg
 Hansen, Hansson: Hanson or Henson
 Blomkvist, Blomqvist, Blomquist: Bloomquist
 Pedersen, Petersen, Petersson, Pettersson: Peterson
 Møller: Moller, Moeller or Miller
 Jacobsen, Jakobsen, Jacobsson, Jakobsson: Jacobson or Jackson
 Nørgård, Nørgaard, Nørregaard: Norgard
 Andersen, Andersson: Anderson
Åsum, Aasum, Aasumb: Awsumb
 Daugaard: Daugard
 Nielsen, Nilsen, Nilsson: Nelson
 Östergård, Østergaard: Ostergard
 Eriksen, Ericsson, Eriksson: Ericson or Erickson
 Hervik: Harwick
 Olsen, Olesen, Olsson, Olesson: Olson
 Skjeldrud: Sheldrew
 Larsen, Larsson: Larson
 Sørkjil: Surchel
 Rikard: Rickard
 Guðmundsson, Gudmundsen: Gudmundson
Sten: Stone

Greek given names
Some Greek names are anglicized using the etymologically related name: Agni: Agnes; Alexandros/Alexis: Alexander/Alex; Alexandra: Alexandra/Alex; Andreas: Andrew; Christophoros: Christopher; Evgenios/Evgenis: Eugene/Gene; Eleni: Helen; Georgios/Yorgos: George; Ioannis/Yannis: John; Irini: Irene; Katharini: Catherine/Kate; Markos: Mark; Michail/Michalis: Michael; Nikolaos: Nicholas; Pavlos: Paul; Petros: Peter; Stephanos: Stephen; Theodoros: Theodore/Ted; and so on.

Besides simple abbreviation or anglicisation of spelling, there are some conventional English versions of or nicknames for Greek names which were formerly widely used and are still encountered:
 Anestis: Ernest
 Alexandros: Alexander, Alex
 Apostolos: Paul
 Aristotelis: Aristotle
 Anastasia: Ana, Stasi, Stacey
 Andreas: Andrew
 Angeliki: Angela, Angel
 Athanasios: Thomas, Tom, Athan, Nathan
 Christos: Chris
 Demosthenes: Dick
 Despina: Dessi, Tessi, Tess
 Dimitrios/Dimi: James, Jim, Jimmy, Demi
 Dionysios: Dennis, Dean
 Haralambos: Harry, Bob
 Harilaos: Charles, Harry
 Eleftherios/Lefteris: Terence, Terry
 Eleftheria: Elli, Terrie
 Eleni: Helen, Elaine
 Evgenia: Eugenia 
 Gavriil: Gabriel, Gabe
 Georgios/ Yiorgos: George
 Ilias: Louie, Elias, Lou, Louis
 Konstantinos/Kostas: Gus, Charles, Frank, Constantine
 Leonidas: Leo
 Maria: Mary, Marie
 Michail: Michael, Mike
 Michaella: Michelle 
 Nikolaos: Nicholas, Nick
 Panayiotis: Peter, Pete (cf. Petros)
 Pavlos: Paul
 Stavros: Steve
 Vasilios: William, Bill; (etymologically correct but not preferred: Basil)

Slavic names
Having immigrated to Canada and United States in the late 19th – early 20th centuries many Ukrainians looked for English equivalents to their given names. In some cases, Canadian or American-born children received two names: the English one (for official purposes) and a Ukrainian one (for family or ethnic community use only).

 Orysya: Erna
 Yaroslav (Jaroslaw): Gerald

Hundreds of Spiritual Christian Doukhobors who migrated from Russia to Canada from 1899 to 1930, changed their surnames. Genealogist Jonathan Kalmakoff posted comprehensive lists for 
 Alberta (1935–1975)
 British Columbia (1936–1975)
 Saskatchewan (1917–1975)

Many descendants of Spiritual Christians from Russia in California, whose parents immigrated to Los Angeles (1904–1912), hid their family surnames due to real and perceived ethnic discrimination during the Cold War. 
 Androff, Veronin: Andrews
 Butchinoff: Baker
 Baklanov: Bakly
 Bolderoff: Bolder
 Pivovaroff: Brewer
 Chernikoff: Cherney
 Arinin, Orloff: Eagles
 Carpoff: Karp
 Chernabieff: Sharon
 Chickenoff, Chickinoff: Chick
 Corneyff: Corney
 Domansky: Domane
 Egnatoff: Egnatu
 Elinov: Eleen
 Fetesoff: Martin
 Fettesoff, Fettisoff: Fettis
 Galitzen: Riley
 Goulokin: Golf
 Gvozdiff: Niles
 Hallivichoff, Golovachev: Hall
 Kalpakoff: Kalp
 Kashirsky: Kash
 Kasimoff: Kazy
 Kisseloff, Kesseloff: Kissell
 Klubnikin: Klubnik
 Konovaloff: Conway
 Kotoff: Kott
 Krasilnikoff: Krase
 Kriakin: Emerald
 Kuznetsoff: Cousins
 Laschenco: Lashin
 Ledieav: Liege
 Mackshanoff: Maxwell
 Melnikoff: Melnick
 Moiseve: Mosser
 Plujnkoff: Pluss
 Popoff: Preston
 Rudometkin: Remmy
 Rudometkin: Ruddy
 Semenisheff: Samoff
 Slivkoff: Martin
 Syapin: Seaking
 Tikhunov: Saber
 Tolmasoff: Thomas, Tolmas
 Urane: Durain
 Uren: Wren
 Varonin: Johnson
 Volkoff: Wolf

German surnames
German Americans are the largest ethnic group in the USA numbering at almost 50 million or roughly 1/6th of US population. Immigration from Germany can be traced back to 1608 (Jamestown, VA), but migration was highest between the mid 19th century and early 20th century. From 1876 to 1923, Germany was the largest source of US Immigrants. From 1923 to 1970, it was the 2nd largest source of US Immigrants after Italy.

A formal immigration process channeling immigrants through Ellis Island only began in 1892. Immigrants arriving prior to this, did not receive official immigration papers documenting their names. This created a fluidity in how families chose to spell their names.

Legal problems caused by spelling variations in Surnames were addressed by the Land Purchases Act. This Act established the principle of idem sonans, that is if differently spelled names "sounded the same," a claim of an unbroken line of ownership could be acknowledged. Since preserving the name's sound was legally important, common forms of Surname changes involved spelling adaptations that helped English readers replicate the original German pronunciation.

As an example, the German surname Eisenhauer could be spelled either in its original form as Eisenhauer or adapted to Eisenhower, Isenhower or Izenhower. All adapted versions preserve the original's pronunciation, but have spelling structures that English readers are more familiar with. Such variations in spelling, is one reason why Germans surnames don't often appear on lists of popular US surnames. One hundred original Eisenhauers, instead get counted as 50 Eisenhauers, 30 Eisenhowers, 10 Isenhowers and 10 Izenhowers, splitting the numbers and making German surnames appear less popular than they really are.

The First and Second World Wars created pockets of xenophobia against German Americans. During the same period, The Anti-Saloon league, successfully lobbied the Government to enact prohibition, using racist "us vs them" propaganda against German Americans, who owned a large percentage of American breweries.

The Anti-German climate in the USA began to improve when Prohibition, which was later considered an economic failure, was revoked in 1933. It further improved when the Nazis were defeated in 1945 under the leadership of Supreme Allied Commander, General Dwight D Eisenhower, a German American.

During the window of Anti-German hostilities in the US, some German Americans chose to blur their connections with their ancestral homeland, by translating part or whole of their surnames into English. Once again, translations that limited change in sound were preferred over those that sounded different. Relative to the sustained German mass immigration during the 19th and early 20th century, this practice of surname translation was unusual and not very widespread.

In the 1940s, automobile registration documents, along with widespread implementation of social security, played an important role in stabilizing American surnames by legally documenting most of the US population's names.

Surname adaptations preserving German pronunciation (most common)

     Bauer: Bower
     Bäumeler: Bimeler
     Böing: Boeing
     Bethke: Bethkey
     Ebersohl: Ebersole
     Euler: Youler
     Eisenhauer: Eisenhower, Isenhour
     Eichhoff: Eikoff
     Fickel: Fickle
     Fruehauf: Freehouf
     Förster: Forster
     Geißler: Geihsler, Geiszler, Geissler
     Göbel: Goebel, Gable
     Güngerich, Guengerich: Gingerich, Gingrich
     Grueter: Gruter
     Heß: Hess
     Heide: Hidy
     Hirschberger: Harshbarger
     Jäger: Jaeger, Yeager
     Jahraus: Yahrous
     Jungfleisch: Yungfleisch
     Jüngling: Yuengling
     Kaiser: Kizer
     Klein: Kline, Cline, Clyne
     König: Koenig
     Kühn: Kuehn
     Krüger: Krueger, Kruger
     Luckenbach: Lookenbaugh
     Melhaus: Milhouse
     Müller: Mueller
     Nonnenmacher: Nunemaker
     Pfersching: Fershing
     Pfannebecker: Fannybacher
     Pfister: Fister
     Richenbacher: Rickenbacker 
     Schmidt: Shmit
     Schoenhoff: Schonhoff, Shonhoff
     Schreiber: Schriber, Shriber
     Schröder: Schroeder, Shroeder, Shroder
     Schultz: Shultz
     Schwartz: Shwartz
     Schuhmacher: Schumacher, Schumaker
     Sedelmeier : Settlemire
     Spengler: Spangler
     Tillmann: Tillman
     Willcke: Willkie
     Zuericher: Zercher

Translated surnames with slight pronunciation change (less common)

     Apfelbaum: Applebaum
    Braun: Brown
    Busch: Bush
     Fischer: Fisher
     Gutweiler: Goodweiler
     Gutmann: Goodman
     Neumann: Newman
     Neumeyer: Newmeyer
     Baumgarten: Baumgarden
     Steinweg: Steinway
     Haudenschild: Haudenshield.

Translated surnames with clearly noticeable pronunciation change (least common)

     Albrecht: Albright
     Becker: Baker
     Fuchs: Fox
     Goldwasser: Goldwater
     Herzfeld: Heartfield
     Langenstein: Longstone
     Müller: Miller
    Schmidt: Smith
    Schneider: Taylor
     Wagner: Waggoner
     Wald: Wood
     Weber: Weaver
     Weiss: White
     Zimmerman: Carpenter

Ashkenazi surnames
 Aaron, A(a)ronovi(t)ch, Aronowicz, Aharonovich, etc.: Aronson, Arnold, Aarons, Arrent, Baron...
 Abraham, Abramovitch, Abramowicz, etc.: Abrahams, Abrahamson, Abrams, Abers, Ames, Aberlin, Albert...
 Abt: Abbott
 Ackermann: Ackerman, Akers, Acre...
 Adam, Adamowicz, Adamovitch: Adams, Adamson, Adcock, Atkins...
 Adelstein, Adelmann: Adel, Adele, Nobel, Noble
 Alexandrovich, Alexandrowicz: Alexander
 Allemann, Adalmann: Allman, Almond
 Allendorf, Allenstein: Allen
 Alt, Alterman, Altmann: Oldman, Olman, Ulman...
 Apfel, Apfelmann: Appel, Apple, Appleman...
 Asher, Ascher: Archer, Ansell, Asherson, Ashley, Ashton, Astley...
 Auerbach, Averbach: Avery, Avers
 Baruch: Benedict, Bennett, Bentley, Bernal, Berthold, Bruck, Brooks, Barrow...
 Baecker, Becker: Baker, Bakerman, Beck...
 Bank, Bankmann: Banks, Bankman
 Bas, Basser, Bassmann: Bass
 Bauer: Bower, Boyer, Farmer
 Beilin, Bella, Beilinsky: Bell, Bellman, Ball...
 Behr, Behrman: Bear, Bearman, Barman, Berman, Byron...
 Belmonte, Schönberg: Belmont
 Berg, Berger, Bergman, Bergstein, etc.: Burke, Hill, Hiller, Hillman, Hillstone, Hilton...
 Benjamin: Benson, Wolf, Woulff...
 Berkowitz: Berkeley
 Bernheim: Burnham
 Bernstein: Burns, Burton
 Biesel: Bickle, Bickel, Bissle, Bissell...
 Binghenheimer: Bingham
 Blau, Blaustein: Blue, Bluestone
 Bloch: Blick, Block
 Blonde, Blondeman: Blond, Blondman
 Blumberg, Blüm, Blumenfeld, Blumenthal, etc.: Bloomberg, Bloom, Bloomfield, Bloomingdale...
 Bolotin: Bolton
 Brandt, Brandtweiner: Brand, Brandy
 Brandeis: Brandis
 Brody: Brady
 Brenner: Brennan, Brenn...
 Breuer, Brauer: Brewer, Brewston...
 Braun, Braunfeld: Brown, Brownfield
 Buch, Buchmann: Buck, Buckman
 Busch: Bush
 Butl, Butlmann: Butler, Buller
 Burstein: Barstone, Barston
 Carlebach, Karl: Carlton, Carlson
 Chernik, Chernikoff: Cherney
 Chesnick: Chester
 Crössmann, Krosmann: Crossman, Cross
 Cohen: Kohn, Kuhn, Kagan, Kogan, Koch, Cook, Cohane, Kane, Caine, Keane, Coe, Conn, Cowen, Cowan, Cowell, Gowan, Coven, Cove, Cullen, Cannon, Collins, Kegan, Kennedy...
 Darmstadt, Darmstadter: Darm, Darmer, Darr, Dermer
 Darlich, Derlich, Derlech: Darley, Derlick
 David, Devid, Davidovich, Davidowitz: Davidson, Davids, Davis, Davies, Davison, Devine, Devlin, Tewel, Teweles...
 Diamant: Diamond
 Dickstein: Dickson
 Durandus: Durant
 Eisner, Eisen, Eisenstein: Iron, Ironstone, Isenhower, Isley...
 Elchanan: Elkin, Atkin...
 Elijah, Eliyahu: Elias, Elie, Ellis, Ellison, Elson, Elton...
 Emanuel: Mendel, Menzel, Menlin, Menkin, Mink, Minkin...
 Ephraim: Fishel, Fish, Fisher, Fishman, Fishlin...
 Epstein: Easton
 Evert, Ewart, Evard, etc.: Evers, Evans, Avert...
 Ezekiel: Haskin, Haskell, Heskel, Caskell...
 Falk, Falke: Falcon, Hawk, Hawke
 Feld, Feldmann, Felder: Field, Fields, Fielder, Fieldman...
 Fein, Feinmann: Fain, Faine, Fine, Fineman
 Feinstein: Finston, Finniston
 Feuermann: Fireman, Fairman
 Feuerstein: Firestone
 Fisch, Fischbein: Fish, Fishbine
 Fink, Finkel, Finkelstein: Finkley, Finley, Fenton
 Fleisch, Fleischer, Fleischmann, etc.: Boucher, Butcher, Butchman...
 Frankel: Frank, Franks, Franklin...
 Fried, Friedman, Freiman: Freed, Freedman, Fredman, Freeman
 Freund, Freundlich, Freundman: Friend, Friendly, Friendman...
 Fuchs: Foss, Fox
 Fuhrmann: Forman, Furman, Carter...
 Furst, Forst, Forster, etc.: First, Forrest, Ford, Foster...
 Gärtner: Ghertner, Gertner, Gardner, Garner...
 Garfinkle, Garfinckel, Gurfinkel, Garfunkel: Garfield, Garland
 Gefen: Geffen, Geff, Goff...
 Gershon, Gershowitz: Gershwin, Garson...
 Glaser, Glazer, Glasman: Glass, Glassman
 Gold, Goldstein, Goldmann, etc.: Gold, Golden, Golding, Goldstone, Goldman...
 Goldschmidt: Goldsmith
 Gottfried, Gottlieb: Godfrey, Goddard...
 Grau, Graustein: Gray, Graystone, Kray, Graw, Craw, Crawford...
 Grossman: Biggs, Gross
 Grodno, Gorodin: Gordon
 Grün, Grünstein, Grüngras, Grünwald, Grünberg, Grünblatt etc.: Green, Greenstone, Greengrass, Greenberg, Greenhill, Greenwood, Greenleaf...
 Grünfeld: Greenfield
 Grünspan, Grynszpan, Grinshpan: Greenspan
 Gutmann: Goodman, Goodwin
 Chaim, Haim, Chaimovich, Chaimowitz etc.: Heim, Hyme, Hyman, Hyde, Hyams...
 Chayyat, Hayat, Schneider, Portnoy, etc.: Taylor, Hyatt, Snyder...
 Hacken, Heker: Hacker
 Halle: Hale, Hall
 Hendler: Handler
 Hillel, Gillel, Gillerovitch: Hellman, Heller, Holman, Halman, Holmes, Hillman, Gillman, Gilles, Gilbert...
 Hirschfeld, Hirsch, Herz, Naftali: Hirshfield, Heartfield, Hertz, Herschel, Hershey, Harris, Harrison, Hart, Hard, Harman, Harding, Harwood, Deer...
 Heilbronn, Heilbronner: Halpern, Halperin, Halparn, Alpert...
 Heinrich: Henri, Henriques, Henry, Hein, Hine, Hineman...
 Helleman, Heller: Helman, Ellmann, Elman
 Hermann: Harman, Herman
 Herring: Harring, Hering, Harrington
 Hoch, Hocher, Hochmann: Hook, Hooker, Hookman, Hodge, Hodges...
 Hollander, Hollaenderski: Holland
 Hollinger, Hollingen: Hollings, Hollingsworth, Hollis...
 Holder: Holden
 Holz, Holtz: Holt, Holton, Wood, Woods
 Hornik, Hornreich, Hornstein, Hornthal: Horn, Horne, Horner, Hornstone, Horndale...
 Horowitz, Horvitz, Horovitch: Horwich, Hurwich, Howard, Harris, Harold, Harvey, Horton...
 Huber, Haber: Hooper, Hoover, Hever...
 Isaac: Isaacs, Isaacson, Hickman, Hickson, Hitchcock, Sachs, Sacks, Saxon, Cox...
 Israel: Isserlin
 Issachar: Axel, Axelrod, Barr, Barton, Barry, Barrell, Barratt, Barnard, Barkin, Bernhardt, Bernard, Berman, Bear, Beer, Barnett...
 Jacob: Jacobs, Jacobson, Jackson, Cobb...
 Jaeger: Hunter, Hunt
 Javitz: Jarvis
 Joel: Joelson, Joelson, Julius...
 Jonah: Jonas, Jones, Joneson
 Joseph: Josephs, Josephson, Jessel, Jessop, Jocelyn, Joslin, Joskin...
 Judah: Judith, Judson, Judd, Judas, Leo, Leon, Lion, Lyon, Lyons, Lionel...
 Kaminski: Kay, Kaye, Kayson...
 Karol, Karolinski, Karolin: Carroll, Karlin, Carlin...
 Kaplan: Copeland, Capp, Cape, Chaplin...
 Katz, Katznellenbogen: Katznelson, Nelson
 Kauffmann: Cuffman, Marchand, Marchant, Merchant...
 Kehr: Kerr, Carr
 Klein: Cline, Kline, Little, Small, Smalls...
 Koenig, Koenigsmann, Koenigsberg, Malach: King, Kingsman, Kingshill, Kingsley, Kingston...
 Konrad, Kundrat, Kunert, Kunard: Conrad, Conrady, Connell, Connelly, Kenny, Kennard...
 Korn, Kornfeld: Corn, Cornfield
 Krahn, Krehn: Crane
 Krauch: Crouch, Crouchman
 Krebs, Kreps: Cripps, Cripp
 Kreisler: Chrysler
 Kristal, Kristallman: Crystal, Crystalman
 Kühlmann, Kühl: Cole, Coleman, Colson, Colton...
 Küpper, Kupfer: Coop, Cooper, Cooperman, Copperstone, Copperfield, Cooperstone...
 Kutner, Kotler: Cutner, Cutter, Cotter, Cotler, Cutler...
 Lambehrt, Lempert, Lemport, Lembert, Lamm: Lambert
 Landau, Landauer, Landeck, Landecker: Land, Landes, Landis, Landon...
 Lang, Langbein, Langenbach, Langendorf, Langenthal, Langer, Langermann: Lang, Langman, Langley, Leng, Long...
 Lavent, Lawrent, Lawrentman, Laventhol: Law, Lauren, Lawton, Lawson, Lawrence...
 Leschnik, Leschziner, Leschnitzer, Leschzinger: Leslie, Lesley, Lester...
 Levi, Levy, Levite: Halevy, Haley, Lavey, Lavor, Lebel, Leblin, Levay, Leib, Lee, Leigh, Leopold, Levin, Levine, Levenson, Leviton, Levison, Levitt, Lewi, Louis, Lewin, Lewinson, Lewis, Lewison, Lowe, Loew, Low, Lowell...
 Lichtzieher: Chandler, Candle
 Licht, Lichtmann: Light, Lightman
 Lieb, Lieberman, Leibovitz, etc.: Love, Loveman, Lee...
 Lindau, Lindauer, Lindemann, Lindenberger: Lindon, Linden, Linton, Lynn...
 Linker: Link, Links, Lincoln
 Lipschitz, Lipschutz, Lipitz: Lipp, Lipkind, Lipson, Lipton...
 Lotstein, Loetstein: Lott, Lottstone, Lytton
 Londoner: London
 Lowenstein: Livingston
 Lukacz, Lukatz, Lukatzky: Lucas
 Macken, Mackmann: Mack
 Manasseh: Mannes, Mones, Money, Munson...
 Mansfeld, Mansfelder: Mansfield
 Margolis: Pearl, Pearlman, Pearlstone...
 Marländer, Marlein: Marlow, Marley
 Marschak, Marschall: Marshall
 Mauer: Mason
 Meier, Maier, Meir, Mair, etc.: Mayer, May, Meyer, Myerson, Myers...
 Monteagudo, Montagna (Sephardic): Montague
 Mordecai: Marcus, Marx, Marks, Markson, Max, Maxson, Maxwell, Martinez, Martins, Martin, Marty...
 Morgenstern, Morgen: Morningstar, Morgan, Morgans, Starr...
 Menahem: Man, Mann, Manson, Manning,  Mandel, Mandelson, Mander, Manders, Manzel...
 Milstein: Milstone, Milesstone, Merrill...
 Misell: Mitchell
 Moses, Mauss, Moshe, Moritz, etc.: Moss, Morris, Morrison, Morton, Moskin, Moslin, Mosesson, Mossel, Marshall...
 Mattias, Matus, Matusoff, Matusowitz, etc.: Matthew, Matthews, Mathias, Mathis, Maddox...
 Müller: Miller, Mills, Mill, Milner, Millman...
 Nasch, Naschmann, Nascher: Nash, Nasher, Nashman
 Nathan: Nathanson, Hanson, Hansen, Hancock
 Neu, Neuhaus, Neumann, Neufeld etc.: New, Newhouse, Newman, Newfield...
 Neumark: Newmark
 Neustadt, Neustädter: Newstead, Newton
 Nikolsburg, Nicholsberg, Nicolauer: Nichols
 Nocham, Nochem: Knox, Nock
 Nordmann: Norman
 Oliviera (Sephardic): Oliver
 Ost, Ostman, Ostmann: East, Eastman, Eastmond
 Barkan, Parkan, Parken: Barker, Park, Parker, Perkin, Perkins...
 Palit: Paley
 Palmbaum, Palmberg, Palm: Palmer
 Paltrowicz, Paltrowitch, Paltrowitz, Palterovich, etc.: Paltrow
 Parnas, Parnes: Barnes
 Pariser, Parischer: Paris, Parrish
 Pauer, Bauer: Power, Powers
 Pecker: Peck
 Pein, Peine, Peiner: Pine, Pinner
 Peinert: Pinert, Pinter
 Pemper: Pember
 Peri, Pereira (Sephardic): Perry, Perri
 Petz, Betz, Pitz, Pietz, Petzmann: Pitt, Pittman
 Peterkowski, Petermann, Petersheim, Petersburg, Petersburger, Petsch: Peter, Peters, Peterson
 Petschauer, Petschau: Petch, Pech
 Piernik, Pieron: Pierce, Pearce, Pearson...
 Pfeiffer: Pepper
 Phillipsborn, Phillipsch, Phillipsruhe, Philipostein, Phillipsthal, Filipowicz...: Phillip, Phillips, Phillipson
 Plattnauer, Plättner: Platt
 Plotkin: Platton
 Poertner, Portmann: Porter, Portman
 Pohl, Pfohl: Pool, Poole
 Polak: Polk, Pollack
 Pötter, Petter: Potter
 Preiss, Preisser: Price
 Presser, Presner, Pressburger, Pretzfeld, Pretzfelder: Press, Preston, Pressfield
 Priester: Priest
 Prinz: Prince
 Rapoport: Rappaport, Rapaport, Portman...
 Reis: Rice
 Reichard: Richard, Richards, Richardson...
 Reinstein: Rhinestone
 Reinhold: Reynold, Reynolds
 Reuven, Rabinowitz: Ruben, Robin, Robbins, Robinson, Roberts...
 Ritter, Ridder: Knight
 Rosen, Rosenberg, Rosenthal, Rosenzweig, Rosenfeld, etc.: Rose, Ross, Rosman, Rosner, Rosefield, Rosehill, Rosedale...
 Roth, Rothstein, Rothfeld: Redd, Redstone, Redfield...
 Rothschild, Schwarzchild: Redshield, Blackshield, Shield, Shields...
 Rudinsky: Rudd
 Samson: Sampson, Simpson
 Samuel: Samuels, Samuelson, Sanders, Sanville, Shinwell, Saville...
 Schapiro, Shapiro: Sapir, Sharp, Spiro...
 Schell, Scheller: Shell, Sheller, Shelley, Shelby...
 Schurr, Schorr: Shore
 Schmidt: Smith, Smitt
 Schwarz, Schwarzstein: Black, Blackman, Blackstone...
 Segel: Segal, Sagan, Sagen...
 Simon: Simons, Simonson, Simmons...
 Silber, Silberstein, Silberschmidt, Silbermann: Silver, Silverstone, Silversmith, Silverman...
 Smolensky: Smollett
 Solomon: Salmon, Salom, Salem, Slowman, Sloman, Slone, Sloan, Salton, Sanford...
 Silberstein: Silverstone
 Spivak: Cantor, Kantor, Canning...
 Spectorski: Spector, Spectar
 Sonnenstein: Sunstone
 Stein, Steiner, Steinfeld, Steinberg, etc.: Stone, Stoner, Stonefield...
 Sukenik, Sukielnik: Draper
 Taube, Toybe, Taubmann: Taubman, Dove
 Trumpeldor: Trump
 Tokarz: Tucker, Tuckerman
 Turnów: Turner
 Vogel, Adler: Eagle, Bird, Burd...
 Waldmann, Waldenberg, Wallenmeier, etc.: Walden, Wald, Walters, Wood, Woods...
 Wallach: Wallace, Wall, Wells...
 Walsch, Welsch: Walch, Walsh, Welsh...
 Wasser, Wassermann, Wasserstein etc.: Waterman, Waters, Waterstone...
 Wein, Weiner, Weinhaus, Weinman, Weingartner, Weinberg, etc.: Wine, Winer, Winehouse, Wineman, Winegarden, Wynn, Wayne...
 Weinstein: Weinstone, Winston
 Weil, Weilstein, Veil: Vail, Wail, Well, Wellstone...
 Weiss, Weissman, Weisz, Weissberg, etc.: White, Whiteman, Whitman, Wise, Whiteman, Ivory...
 Yaroshevitz: Yarrow
 Yochanan: Johnathan, John, Johnson, Jansen, Jenkins...
 Zimmermann: Carpenter
 Zusskind, Zucker, Zuckerman, etc.: Zuckerberg, Sweet, Swett, Suskind, Sugar...

Italian surnames
Italian surnames were often anglicized in the United States: for example, the i-ending of a number of Italian names becomes y, e, or ie.

 Amici: Ameche
 Barbieri: Barber
 Bevilacqua: Drinkwater
 Bianco: White
 Bonfiglio: Bonfield
 Borgnino: Borgnine
 Brucceleri: Brooklier
 Canadeo: Kennedy
 Castiglia: Costello
 Cestaro: Chester
 Cilibrizzi: Celebrezze
 Cipulli: Cipully
 Cucco, Cuoco: Cook
 DeCesare: Chase
 Mercante: Merchant
 Morillo: Morill
 Pace: Pace same spelling different pronunciation
 Perri: Perry
 Piccolo: Little
 Rossellini: Russell
 Rossi: Ross
 Sangiovanni: St. John
 Saraceni: Sarazen
 Scalice, Scalise: Scalise, Scalish
 Scornavacca, Scornavacco: Scarnavack
 Ta(g)liaferro: Tolliver, Toliver
 Trafficante: Traficant
 Valentino: Valentine
 Vinciguerra: Winwar

Dutch surnames
When Dutch immigrants arrived in the United States, often their names got changed. This was either done on purpose, to make the name easier to write and remember, or by accident because the clerk didn't know how to spell the name and wrote it down phonetically."Making Sense Of Your Dutch Surname" , dutchancestrycoach.com, 27 June 2010.

 Aalderink: Aaldering, Aldering
 Buiel: Boyle
 Damkot: Damcott
 de Jong: Dejong, DeYoung
 Dijkstra: Dykstra
 Filips: Philips
 Gerritsen: Garrison
 Glieuwen: Glewen
 Goudswaard: Houseworth
 Janszoon, Janssens: Johnson
 Kempink: Camping
 Konings: King
 Kuiper: Cooper
 Langstraat: Longstreet
 Meester: Master
 Nieuwenhuis, Nijenhuis: Newhouse
 Piek: Pike
 Pieterszoon, Pieters: Peterson, Peters
 Smid: Smith
 Spaak: Spock
 Van Cruijningen: Cunningham
 Veenhuis: Feenhouse
 Welhuis, Welhuizen: Wellhouse, Willhouse
 Zutphen: Sutphin

Colonization by English-speaking countries
North America 
Coastal Salish
Coastal Salish people were often given "Boston names" by early European settlers. These English names often had similar sounds to original Lushootseed names.

When Lushootseed names were integrated into English, they were often recorded and pronounced very differently.  An example of this is Chief Seattle. The name Seattle is an anglicisation of the modern Duwamish conventional spelling Si'ahl, equivalent to the modern Lushootseed spelling siʔaɫ . He is also known as Sealth, Seathle, Seathl, or See-ahth'.

See also
 Anglicisation

Notes

Bibliography

 H. L. Mencken, The American Language, 2nd edition, 1921, Chapter X, part 2. full text
 H. L. Mencken, The American Language, 4th edition, 1936, pp. 510–525.
 H. L. Mencken, The American Language'', Supplement Two, 1948, pp. 516–525.

English language
Cultural assimilation
Americanized surnames
Names by culture